Bill W. and Dr. Bob is a play written by Stephen Bergman and Janet Surrey, published by Samuel French, Inc.
The play will return to Off-Broadway after being produced in some thirty of the fifty United States, Australia, Canada, and England. Bill W. and Dr. Bob began previews at The Soho Playhouse on July 8, 2013.

The first production of Bill W. and Dr. Bob  began previews off-Broadway at New World Stages on February 16, 2007 and opened on March 5, 2007. It ran for 132 performances  and closed on June 10, 2007. It is based on the story of William Wilson (Bill W.) and Dr. Robert Smith (Bob S., or "Dr. Bob"), the founders of Alcoholics Anonymous and their wives Lois Wilson and Anne Smith, creators of Al-Anon. Bill W. and Dr. Bob is written by Stephen Bergman and Janet Surrey, produced by Bradford S. Lovette, Dr. Michael and Judith Weinberg, and  The New Repertory Theatre and stars Marc Carver as Man,  Kathleen Doyle as Anne Smith, Deanna Dunmyer as Woman, Rachel Harker as Lois Wilson, Patrick Husted as Dr. Bob Smith and Robert Krakovski as Bill Wilson. It was directed by Rick Lombardo and with music composed by Ray Kennedy.

A video was produced of  the 2007 Off-Broadway production by The Hazelden Foundation.

External links
 Broadway World
Playbill
Theatremania.com
Samuel French, Inc
Official website

Alcoholics Anonymous
American plays
2007 plays
2013 plays
Works by Samuel Shem
Off-Broadway plays
Plays based on real people
Fiction set in 1935